Nara Lokesh (born 23 January 1983) is an Indian politician. He is the son of the former Chief Minister of Andhra Pradesh and Telugu Desam Party (TDP) chief N. Chandrababu Naidu and Nara Bhuvaneshwari. He is also the grandson of N. T. Rama Rao.

Early life and education
Lokesh has an MBA from Stanford University Graduate School of Business and Bachelor of Science with a specialization in Management Information Systems from Carnegie Mellon University.

Political career

Early political career and electoral statistics 
Lokesh started his political career in TDP. In 2014, Lokesh became TDP's General Secretary, a member of the Politburo, the highest decision-making body of the party. He managed the party, interacted with party workers and citizens, and helped set the party policies and strategy. He claimed in January 2013 that Rahul Gandhi and the Congress party derived the Direct Benefit Transfer System from a TDP proposal submitted to the central government. He was first elected as the Member of Legislative Council in 2017.Though he never won a direct election, he held several key positions in both party and state of Andhra Pradesh. His father N. Chandrababu Naidu, Chief minister of Andhra Pradesh made appointed him as a cabinet minister for IT, Panchayati Raj and Rural development in 2017 through. In 2019, he unsuccessfully contested from the Mangalgiri constituency which had a narrow margin defeat in the previous election,and lost to Alla Ramakrishna Reddy (YSRCP candidate). This came as a humiliating defeat to him.

Lokesh is credited with successfully managing the TDP party's membership drive that added five million members. The digital technology used by the onboarding team – tablets, live data feeds and a real-time dashboard – was probably the first such use for enrolling and managing party members in the country.

Development and welfare models
Lokesh has been one of the Trustees of NTR Memorial Trust (popularly known as NTR Trust) on Healthcare, Education, Skills Enhancement and Disaster Management. He oversees the disaster response program of the Trust that operates in times of natural calamities.Each active member of the party will get a personal insurance cover of ₹2 lakh in case of a fatal accident, ₹2 lakh for permanent disability, ₹1 lakh for the partially disabled, and ₹50,000 in case of accidental injuries.

Lokesh-led party online membership drive fetched TDP 53+ lakh members.

Padayatra 
On 27th January 2023 Nara Lokesh started Yuvagalam padayatra for youth of Andhra Pradesh for 400 days with a road-map to walk 4,000 kms from Kuppam to Srikakulam.

Awards and recognition
Lokesh won the "Skoch Person of the Year" award in 2018, for his innovative use of technology while resolving issues related to drinking water supply, transparency in governance, and other activities under his Panchayati Raj portfolio.

In May 2018, he won the Business World magazine "Digital Leader of the Year" at the Businessworld Digital India summit in New Delhi. The award recognises the best utilisation of technology in governance. The same year, the Kalam Centre for Livable Planet Earth and Sustainable Development recognised Lokesh's efforts in the successful integration of technology in rural governance and awarded the innovation award to Andhra Pradesh in the Panchayat Raj and Rural Development category. He was also awarded the Kalam Innovation in Governance Award in 2018.

In September 2018, Lokesh was invited to represent India at the World Economic Forum (WEF) Entrepreneurship Summit and Annual Meeting of World Champions in Tianjin, China. In the following month, he became the only Indian politician to be nominated to the WEF's Network of Global Future Councils (NGFC), an interdisciplinary knowledge group that deliberates on agile governance in terms of emerging technologies and business models.

Personal life
In 2007, Lokesh married Brahmani, his first cousin on maternal side and daughter of actor and politician Nandamuri Balakrishna. The couple has a son, Devansh.

References

|-

External links

1983 births
Living people
Members of the Andhra Pradesh Legislative Council
Telugu Desam Party politicians
Stanford University alumni
Carnegie Mellon University alumni
Telugu politicians
Andhra Pradesh politicians